In Greek mythology, Arke or Arce (Árkē, meaning "swift") is one of the daughters of Thaumas and sister to Iris. During the Titanomachy, Arke fled from the Olympians' camp and joined the Titans, unlike Iris who remained loyal to Zeus and his allies. After the war was over and the Titans with their allies were defeated, Zeus cut off her wings and cast Arke into Tartarus.

Mythology 
She and Iris were both messenger goddesses. During the Titanomachy, she sided with the Titans against the Olympian gods; she became the messenger for the Titans, while Iris became the messenger of the Olympian Gods. When the Olympian gods won, Zeus punished Arke. She was deprived of her wings and cast into Tartarus, together with the vanquished Titans. "foot" + the name of Arke).

In Eumelus of Corinth's lost epic Titanomachy, it seems that the messenger of the Titans was called Ithas, identified with Prometheus.

See also 

 Hermes
 Caduceus
 Atlas

Notes

References

Bibliography 
 Photius, Bibliotheca excerpts, sections 1-166 translated by John Henry Freese, from the SPCK edition of 1920, now in the public domain, and other brief excerpts from subsequent sections translated by Roger Pearse (from the French translation by René Henry, ed. Les Belles Lettres).

External links 
 ARKE from the Theoi Project

Greek goddesses
Messenger goddesses
Condemned souls in Tartarus
Sky and weather goddesses
Avian humanoids
Deeds of Zeus